In the Dark is a podcast produced by American Public Media (APM), with episodes released between September 2016 and October 2020.  Hosted and narrated by Madeleine Baran, and produced by Samara Freemark, the series featured investigative journalism and in-depth reportage from APM's investigative reporting and documentary unit, APM Reports.  The series produced two full seasons, each focusing on a high-profile case and the actions and conduct in the policing or prosecuting of those cases — the kidnapping/murder of Jacob Wetterling (Season 1) and the quadruple homicide case for which Curtis Flowers was tried 6 times (Season 2).  A subsequent "Special Report" series, released in Spring 2020, reported on the impact of the COVID-19 pandemic in the Mississippi Delta.  The series was cancelled in May 2022 as part of APM's dissolving of APM Reports and "incorporating select programming elements" from the unit into its MPR News operation.
 In March 2023, In the Dark joined The New Yorker to produce and distribute the upcoming third season.

Series overview
In the Darks hallmark was focusing not so much on a crime itself but more on the behavior of law enforcement and prosecutors in their investigation of those crimes, as well as how such behavior affected the accused and their families, the victims' families, and surrounding communities.  In discussing the show's first season with Esquire in November 2016, host/lead reporter Madeleine Baran noted that the APM team's "clear line of reporting" (her term) focused less on who kidnapped and murdered Jacob Wetterling, and instead more on how and why the crime went so long without resolution and the resulting impact.  In comparison to other true crime podcasts (e.g. Serial) that attempt to investigate a crime, Baran told Esquire that the In the Dark was "not a mystery novel" and that APM Reports did not set out to play detective and solve the case, stating that "we saw ourselves as investigating the investigation."

The inspiration for In the Darks title came from not only the time when Wetterling was kidnapped (just after 9:00 p.m. CDT on October 22, 1989) but also the lack of transparency by the Stearns County, Minnesota Sheriff's Department in the case.  As Baran put it to MPR News, "There's this crime that happened in the dark and, also, there's this investigation that happened in the dark."

Season 1
Season 1 of In the Dark explored the case of Jacob Wetterling, an 11-year-old boy from St. Joseph, Minnesota who was kidnapped and murdered on the night of October 22, 1989.  Wetterling's case went unsolved for 27 years until his remains were discovered in a pasture near Paynesville, Minnesota on September 1, 2016.  The location was revealed by Danny Heinrich, a long-time person of interest in the abduction of another boy, Jared Scheierl, in the nearby town of Cold Spring.  On September 6, 2016, Heinrich admitted to kidnapping and murdering Wetterling as well as the abduction and sexual assault of Scheierl.  Heinrich would be sentenced on November 21, 2016, to a 20-year prison term for a federal child pornography charge.

Production on Season 1 had been underway for 9 months and was in its final stages (it was scheduled to premiere on September 13, 2016) by the time Wetterling's remains were discovered and Heinrich confessed to the crime.  The developments, which host/lead reporter Madeleine Baran and the APM Reports team were not expecting ahead of time, prompted them to re-edit and re-record the first two episodes (at least the first of which was already finished) and move up their release to September 7, one day after Heinrich's court appearance.

The edits to the first two episodes of In the Dark turned out to be minimal, for by then, the reporting team's focus wasn't so much about who may have been responsible for Jacob Wetterling's disappearance but more about the investigation of the crime and its effects on the community.  The team focused on systemic failures in the Wetterling investigation, in particular how the Stearns County Sheriff's Office handled not only the case but other similar cases.  

In addition to examining the actions of the Stearns County Sheriff's Office, broader repercussions of the Wetterling case were also explored, including the impact on Jacob's family and friends (Jacob's parents, Jerry and Patty Wetterling, were extensively featured); its effect on the immediate Stearns County area; and national implications, including the establishment of a federal law, named in Jacob's honor, that requires states to implement and contribute to registries that track sex offenders and crimes against children.

Episode summary
As indicated above, the release dates of In the Darks first two episodes were initially scheduled for a September 13, 2016, release date.  The developments that led to Danny Heinrich's confession in the Jacob Wetterling case prompted APM to re-record those episodes and release them on September 7, six days earlier than scheduled.  The third episode was released on September 13, with one new episode released each Tuesday thru October 25.  Follow-up episodes were released in December 2016 and September 2018.

Season 2
The second season of In the Dark explored the legal odyssey surrounding Curtis Flowers, who was accused of shooting four people to death inside Tardy Furniture, a Winona, Mississippi store, in July 1996.  Flowers, who had worked at Tardy Furniture for only a few days and who had long maintained his innocence, faced trial for the murders six times.  The first five of those trials resulted in either hung juries or reversals on appeal.  A sixth jury trial, in 2010, ended with Flowers' conviction on four counts of capital murder, but the United States Supreme Court remanded the case to a lower court to review racial bias in jury selection.  After Mississippi's Supreme Court upheld Flowers' conviction by a 5–4 vote, Flowers once again went to the U.S. Supreme Court, who heard oral arguments on the appeal in March 2019, and ruled, by a 7–2 decision on June 21, 2019, to overturn his conviction and send the case back to the lower courts.  Flowers was moved from death row that September, and released on bail the following December.  The Mississippi Attorney General's office reviewed the case and moved to dismiss the indictment against him with prejudice; a judge granted the motion on September 4, 2020.

While the APM Reports team never set out to prove Flowers' guilt or innocence, the investigation featured in In the Dark was credited with alerting the public and turning the case around.  Indeed, much as with how its first season focused on the conduct of those investigating Jacob Wetterling's disappearance, Season 2's storyline — which began with an e-mail tip to APM Reports and led to a nearly year-long investigation — pivoted from the murders Flowers had been tried and convicted for to the conduct of the district attorney's office in Mississippi's Fifth Circuit Court District.  Actions by two figures in the D.A.'s office are specified, D.A. Doug Evans (who prosecuted Flowers and expressed certainty of his guilt) and office investigator John Johnson (lead investigator in the Tardy Furniture case).

In its investigation of Flowers' case for In the Darks 2nd season, the APM team revealed four noteworthy actions by the D.A.'s office that appeared to ensure Flowers' conviction, actions were mentioned in the state's motion to dismiss:
The consideration, by Evans and Johnson, of Flowers as the only suspect in the Tardy Furniture murders.
The reliance on a key prosecution witness, Odell Hallmon, whose testimony that he heard Flowers confess to the murders turned out to be a falsehood.
The revelation, in the season's 10th episode, that Evans' office withheld from defense attorneys the fact that an "alternative suspect," Willie James Hemphill, was held for questioning in the case.  Flowers' legal team cited this revelation in their June 2018 appeal to the Supreme Court of Mississippi.
The efforts by Evans to empanel all-white or majority-white juries against Flowers (who is African American), and striking as many Black jurors from jury consideration as possible.  It is this aspect that the U.S. Supreme Court cited in its June 2019 decision to overturn Flowers' conviction.

In addition to examining Flowers' case, In the Darks second season profiled Curtis' family.  Historical anecdotes about racial issues in Winona (which has a majority Black population) and northern Mississippi were also incorporated.

Episode summary
Season 2 of In the Dark began with the release of its first two episodes on May 1, 2018, with one new episode being released each Tuesday through, initially, July 3, 2018.  Later developments in the Flowers were covered bu additional episodes, the last of which (an interview with Curtis Flowers himself) was released on October 14, 2020.

Special Report: Coronavirus in the Delta
In Spring 2020, In the Dark would return to Mississippi for a limited-run special report.  Rather than focus solely on matters of crime or jurisprudence, the special series would instead examine the effects of the COVID-19 coronavirus pandemic on rural America, in particular the Mississippi Delta.  Six episodes, released between April and June 2020, would be included in the special report.

Awards
In the Dark was a two-time recipient of the Peabody Award.  The show's first Peabody honor came in Spring 2017, with the award's governing body applauding the program for its "immaculate storytelling talent and journalistic precision" in its probing the investigation of Jacob Wetterling's disappearance as well as its "deftly incisive" way of telling the human side of the case and its broader policy implications.  The second Peabody came in June 2020, recognizing the show's work in not only "systemically dismantl[ing]" (the jury's term) the case against Curtis Flowers, but also building a case against the District Attorney who prosecuted Flowers, and recognizing those who have lived under the shadow of the case.

See also
List of American crime podcasts

References

External links

In The Dark on Spotify

2016 podcast debuts
Audio podcasts
Investigative journalism
American talk radio programs
American Public Media programs
Peabody Award-winning radio programs
Crime podcasts